Bloodbrothers is the third album by The Dictators and their second after switching to the Asylum label. "Faster and Louder" features an uncredited guest appearance from Bruce Springsteen.

Critical reception
AllMusic, which was critical of the band's previous album, released a favorable review of Bloodbrothers, stating that it "stands as a good example of what the band sounded like on a good night," as well as calling it "The Dictators' most rockingest and most musical album."

Track listing

Personnel
The Dictators
Handsome Dick Manitoba – lead vocals
Ross "The Boss" Friedman – lead guitar, 12-string guitar
Scott "Top Ten" Kempner – rhythm guitar
Andy Shernoff – bass guitar, keyboards, lead and backing vocals
Richie Teeter – drums, backing vocals

Production
Murray Krugman, Sandy Pearlman – producers
Shelly Yakus, Jay Krugman – engineers
Johnny Lee, The Dictators - art direction
Chris Callis - front cover photography

References

The Dictators albums
1978 albums
Asylum Records albums
Albums produced by Murray Krugman
Albums produced by Sandy Pearlman